The 2015 Ogun State House of Assembly election was held on April 11, 2015, to elect members of the Ogun State House of Assembly in Nigeria. All the 26 seats were up for election in the Ogun State House of Assembly. APC won 17 seats, while PDP won 9 seat.

Upon the opening of the 8th State House of Assembly, Suraj Adekunbi (APC-Yewa North I) was elected as Speaker of the House while Olakunle Oluomo (APC-Ifo II) and Asiwaju Yinka Mafe (APC-Sagamu I) became Deputy Speaker and House Leader, respectively.

Results

Abeokuta South I 
APC candidate Victor Fasanya won the election.

Abeokuta South II 
APC candidate Olowofuja Nureni won the election.

Odeda 
APC candidate Sogbein Yetunde won the election.

Abeokuta North 
APC candidate Ojodu Olayiwola won the election.

Obafemi-Owode 
APC candidate Tunde Sanusi won the election.

Ifo I 
APC candidate Oluomo Taiwo won the election.

Ifo II 
APC candidate Ganiyu Oyedeji won the election.

Ewekoro 
APC candidate Jolaoso Israel won the election.

Ijebu North II 
APC candidate Oludare Kadiri won the election.

Ogun Waterside 
APC candidate Harrison Adeyemi won the election.

Odogbolu 
APC candidate Adebowale Oladimeji won the election.

Sagamu I 
APC candidate Mafe Adeyinka won the election.

Ikenne 
APC candidate Samuel Olusola won the election.

Remo North 
APC candidate Adebiyi Adeleye won the election.

Yewa North I 
APC candidate Suraj Adekunbi won the election.

Ado/Odo/Ota I 
APC candidate Aina Nurudeen won the election.

Ado/Odo/Ota II 
APC candidate Bankole Olusola won the election.

Ijebu North I 
PDP candidate Bowale Solaja won the election.

Ijebu-East 
PDP candidate Oyenuga Adejuwon won the election.

Ijebu North East 
PDP candidate Olujimi James won the election.

Ijebu-Ode 
PDP candidate Alausa Olawale won the election.

Sagamu II 
PDP candidate Soyebo Mojeed won the election.

Imeko-Afon 
PDP candidate Akingbade Jemili won the election.

Egbado South/Ilaro/Owode 
PDP candidate Akintayo Julianah won the election.

Idiroko/Ipokia 
PDP candidate Ojo Adebowale won the election.

Yewa North II 
PDP candidate Oduntan Atanda won the election.

References 

Ogun State House of Assembly elections
House of Assembly
Ogun